Kishor (}) is a name mostly used in India and Nepal. It is derived from the Sanskrit word kishora meaning "colt" or a "cub". It translates to "young", "youth" or "adolescence" in English.

People with the given name 
 Kishor Gurung, Nepalese guitarist and ethnomusicologist 
 Kishor Kadam (born 1967), Marathi poet (known as Saumitra) and actor
 Kishor Shantabai Kale (1970–2007), Marathi writer and social worker from Maharashtra, India
 Kishor Kumar (1929–1987), Indian actor, musician, and filmmaker
 Kishor C. Mehta, American professor of civil engineering at Texas Tech University, specializing in wind engineering
 Kishor Nath, Indian politician
 Kishor Parekh (1930–1982), Indian photojournalist 
 Kishor Patel (born 1982), English cricketer (a right-handed batsman)
 Kishor Appa Patil (born 1970), Indian politician
 Kishor Phadke (born 1936), Indian psychologist
 Kishor Satya (born 1974), Indian actor
 Kishor kumar sahu (born 1995),Indian Esports player

People with the surname 
 Akshara Kishor (born 2008), Indian actress
 Kamal Kishor (born 1956), Indian politician
 Prashant Kishor (born 1977), Indian political advisor
 Ram Kishor (1918–1994), Indian Hindu leader

See also 
 Kishore (disambiguation)

Indian masculine given names